Stephen Kupryk (born May 26, 1987) is an American professional wrestler. He is currently signed to Impact Wrestling, where he performs under the ring name Steve Maclin. He is also known for his time in WWE, where he performed under the ring name Steve Cutler.

Professional wrestling career

Early career (2013–2014) 
On January 26, 2013, Kupryk made his professional wrestling debut at an Monster Factory Pro Wrestling (MFPW) event under the ring name Tommy Maclin, where he defeated Anthony Bennett. In MFPW, he won the MFPW Heavyweight Championship and the MFPW Tag Team Championship.

WWE (2014–2021) 
In 2014, Kupryk signed a contract with the WWE and began training at the WWE Performance Center. He made his debut under the ring name Steve Cutler on the July 3 episode of NXT, losing to CJ Parker. In February 2018, he began teaming with Jaxson Ryker and Wesley Blake as The Forgotten Sons. The trio made their first televised appearance the August 29 episode of NXT in a backstage segment with general manager William Regal. Cutler and Blake represented the group in the 2019 Dusty Rhodes Tag Team Classic, where they defeated Danny Burch and Oney Lorcan in the first round and Moustache Mountain in the semi-finals before losing to Aleister Black and Ricochet in the final. At NXT TakeOver: XXV, Cutler and Blake competed in a fatal four-way ladder match for the vacant NXT Tag Team Championship, and despite interference from Ryker, the two were unsuccessful in winning. The group entered the 2020 Dusty Rhodes Tag Team Classic, but were eliminated in the first round by Imperium (Fabian Aichner and Marcel Barthel). 

On the April 10, 2020 episode of SmackDown, The Forgotten Sons made their main roster debut, defeating Lucha House Party (Gran Metalik and Lince Dorado). On the May 1 episode of SmackDown, they defeated SmackDown Tag Team Champions The New Day (Big E and Kofi Kingston). This led to a fatal four-way tag team match also involving Lucha House Party, and John Morrison and the Miz for the title at Money in the Bank, where The New Day retained. The Forgotten Sons began portraying themselves as American patriots, with Cutler and Ryker highlighting their services in the Marines. However, the gimmick was dropped due to a controversial tweet by Ryker supporting President Donald Trump in the middle of the Black Lives Matter movement and the George Floyd protests, which led to backlash from backstage, social media, and within the fan base. The Forgotten Sons were then taken off television as a result. On the December 4 episode of SmackDown, Cutler and Blake, now known as The Knights of the Lone Wolf, made their return by accompanying King Corbin to the ring as they helped him defeat Murphy. However, on February 4, 2021, Cutler was released from his WWE contract.

Impact Wrestling (2021–present) 
On June 3, 2021, it was announced that Kupryk, using the ring name Steve Maclin, signed a contract with Impact Wrestling. He made his in-ring debut 
on the June 17 episode of Impact!, defeating Jason Page. Maclin started a feud with Petey Williams, defeating him at Emergence and on the September 9 episode of Impact!. Maclin then entered a tournament to determine the new X Division Champion, where he defeated Williams and Black Taurus in the first round, only to lose to Trey Miguel in the final at Bound for Glory, when he pinned El Phantasmo. He got another chance at the title by defeating then-number one contender Laredo Kid on the November 18 episode of Impact!, making it a three-way match at Turning Point. At Turning Point, Maclin lost to Miguel again when he pinned Kid. In December, Maclin kidnapped Miguel backstage and received another shot at the X-Division title at Hard To Kill, with the added stipulation that if Maclin lost, he would not get another title opportunity as long as Miguel was champion. At Hard To Kill, Maclin failed to beat Miguel, and could no longer challenge for the X Division Championship.

On the January 20, 2022 episode of Impact!, Maclin fought Jonathan Gresham for the ROH World Championship in a losing effort. At No Surrender, he was part of Team Impact in a 10-man tag team match against Honor No More, but failed to win after Eddie Edwards betrayed them. On March 5, at Sacrifice, Maclin interfered in Rhino's match with Edwards after hitting the former with a kendo stick. At Rebellion, he defeated Chris Sabin and Jay White in a three-way match. On the May 5 episode of Impact!, Maclin lost against New Japan Pro-Wrestling (NJPW) talent Tomohiro Ishii. Two days later, at Under Siege, he lost to Sabin. On the Slammiversary pre-show, Maclin competed in the Reverse Battle Royal, but was eliminated by Chris Bey. On July 1, at Against All Odds, Maclin interfered in the Clockwork Orange House of Fun match by attacking Sami Callihan and helped Moose get the victory. On August 12, at Emergence, he lost against Callihan in a no disqualification match. Six days later, Maclin competed in a six-way elimination match to determine the number one contender to the Impact World Championship, which was won by Edwards. On September 23, at Victory Road, he won a three-way Barbed Wire Massacre against Callihan and Moose. At Bound for Glory, Maclin competed in the Call Your Shot Gauntlet, where the winner could choose any championship match of their choice, being the runner-up in the match after losing to the returning Bully Ray.

On January 13, 2023, at Hard To Kill, Maclin defeated Rich Swann in a Falls Count Anywhere match. On February 24, at No Surrender, Maclin defeated Brian Myers, PCO and Heath, who Maclin pinned, in a four-way match to become the number one contender for Josh Alexander's Impact World Championship.

BRCW (2022–present)  
On May 15th he made the debut show of Boca Raton Championship Wrestling.

Personal life 
In 2020, Kupryk started dating fellow Impact wrestler and New Jersey native Deonna Purrazzo.  On February 12, 2022, Purrazzo announced that she and Kupryk were engaged. They were married on November 10, 2022.

Championships and accomplishments 
Destiny World Wrestling
Destiny Wrestling World Championship (1 time, current)
Monster Factory Pro Wrestling
 MFPW Heavyweight Championship (2 times)
 MFPW Tag Team Championship (1 time) – with Mike Spanos
 Pro Wrestling Illustrated
 Ranked No. 268 of the top 500 singles wrestlers in the PWI 500 in 2022
The Wrestling Revolver
Revolver Championship (1 time, current)
PWR Tag Team Championship (1 time) – with Westin Blake

References

External links 

 Steve Maclin's Impact Wrestling profile
 
 

1987 births
American male professional wrestlers
Living people
People from Rutherford, New Jersey
Professional wrestlers from New Jersey
21st-century professional wrestlers